The Sudan Library is a section of the library of the University of Khartoum. It serves as the national library of Sudan and is also a university research library.

It is a depository of all Sudanese publications since a legal deposit act came into effect in 1966. The library also collects works of Sudanese authors and works about Sudan published abroad. Its catalogue represents a retrospective national bibliography.

See also
 National Records Office of Sudan

References

Sudan
Academic libraries
Libraries in Sudan
Deposit libraries